Samuel Shaw may refer to:

Sports
Dexter Lumis (born 1984), American professional wrestler also known as Samuel Shaw
Samuel Shaw (bowls player) from Lawn bowls at the 1996 Summer Paralympics
Samuel Shaw (tennis), played in 1883 U.S. National Championships – Men's Doubles

Others
Samuel Shaw (politician) (1768–1827), American politician
 Samuel Shaw (naval officer), first American whistleblower
Samuel Shaw (minister) (1635–1696), English nonconformist minister
Samuel Shaw (New Zealand) (1819–?), New Zealand labour reformer
Samuel Shaw, commander of 
Samuel Shaw (police officer) from Kingston Police
Samuel Shaw Residence on National Register of Historic Places listings in Summit County, Ohio
Samuel Shaw (consul) (1754–1794), first American consul to China at the consulate in Canton
Samuel R. Shaw (1911–1989), United States Marine Corps general
Samuel Shaw (slave trader) (1718-1781), operating from the Port of Liverpool

See also
Sam Shaw (disambiguation)
Samuel Shore (disambiguation)